Karierne is an urban-type settlement in Beryslav Raion, Kherson Oblast, southern Ukraine. It is located in the steppe,  from the right bank of the Inhulets. Karierne belongs to Velyka Oleksandrivka settlement hromada, one of the hromadas of Ukraine. It has a population of

Administrative status 
Until 18 July, 2020, Karierne belonged to Velyka Oleksandrivka Raion. The raion was abolished in July 2020 as part of the administrative reform of Ukraine, which reduced the number of raions of Kherson Oblast to five. The area of Velyka Oleksandrivka Raion was merged into Beryslav Raion.

Economy

Transportation
The closest railway station is Bila Krynytsia, on the railway connecting Apostolove and Snihurivka (with further connections to Kherson and Mykolaiv). There is some passenger traffic.

The settlement has road connections with Kryvyi Rih, Snihurivka, and Beryslav.

See also 

 Russian occupation of Kherson Oblast

References

Urban-type settlements in Beryslav Raion